Sweet Sweetback's Baadasssss Song is the soundtrack to Melvin Van Peebles' 1971 feature film of the same name. The soundtrack was performed by then-unknown Earth, Wind & Fire and released in 1971 on Stax Records. To attract publicity for the film without spending significant money, the soundtrack was released before the movie; it performed well, reaching No. 13 on the Billboard Top R&B Albums chart.

Overview
As a soundtrack the album was ranked at No. 32 on Mojo's "MOJO 1000 – The Ultimate CD Buyers Guide".

Track listing

Side One
"Sweetback Losing His Cherry" (2:45)
"Sweetback Getting It Uptight And Preaching It So Hard The Bourgeois Reggin Angels In Heaven Turn Around" (5:00)
"Come On Feet Do Your Thing" (4:15)
"Sweetback's Theme" (7:36)

Side Two
"Hoppin' John" (2:25)
"Voices" (0:11)
"Mojo Woman" (2:43)
"Voices" (0:15)  
"Sanra Z" (3:47)
"Voices" (0:17)
"Reggins Hanging On In There As Best They Can" (2:58)
"Voices" (1:13)
"Won't Bleed Me" (2:41)
"The Man Tries Running His Usual Game but Sweetback's Jones Is So Strong He Wastes the Hounds (Yeah! Yeah! and Besides That He Will Be Comin' Back Takin' Names and Collecting Dues)" (4:25)

References

Earth, Wind & Fire albums
Melvin Van Peebles albums
1971 soundtrack albums
Stax Records soundtracks
Stax Records albums
Action film soundtracks
Thriller film soundtracks